Fengbo may refer to:

Fengbo (deity), Taoist deity of the wind
A Storm in a Teacup (short story), 1920 short story by Lu Xun
Fengbo station of the Beijing Subway